Joseph Tamale Mirundi is a Ugandan journalist, author and political analyst who appears on the STV political show Sharp Talk with Tamale Mirundi . In 2022, Tamale opened up an online newspaper where he publishes news and information named Kab News. He previously appeared on NBS Television on the One on One show. He is a former presidential press secretary, and media advisor. 

Tamale was a part-time writer for the newspaper Munno before he became a professional journalist. In 2017, he was suspended from the One On One show for use of abusive language. He was rewarded by President Yoweri Museveni with a new car for his media work. He also predicted the downfall of Eric Sakwa. He has predicted that the party People Power, Our Power under Bobi Wine will have more seats after the 2021 elections. In 2015, his first wife Juliet Nassimbwa wanted to divorce him due to political differences. He alleged that he was poisoned in 2019. He was also taken to court by lawyer Mabirizi over defamation. In 2015, the judges urged president Museveni to fire him over inciting violence in the citizens. As of 16 June 2020, Tamale has ended his appearances on the One on One  show at NBS Television. The following day he announced that the show would be available on Facebook and YouTube until further notice.

References 

Ugandan writers
Ugandan politicians
Ugandan journalists
Ugandan television journalists
1964 births
Living people